Gordons-Saraga Urban LLG is a local-level government (LLG) of National Capital District, Papua New Guinea.

References

Local-level governments of National Capital District (Papua New Guinea)